Vinice is a settlement in the Municipality of Sodražica in southern Slovenia. It lies just off the main road to Ribnica. The area is part of the traditional region of Lower Carniola and is now included in the Southeast Slovenia Statistical Region.

Name
The plural name Vinice (as well as the singular Vinica) likely derives from a forgotten meaning of the common noun vinica (now 'wine cellar'), probably referring to an area with vineyards (cf. Polish winnica 'vineyard').

Notable people
Notable people that were born or lived in Vinice include:
Ivan Prijatelj (1875–1937), literary historian

References

External links

Vinice on Geopedia

Populated places in the Municipality of Sodražica